Thomas Schmidt (born 4 June 1996) is a New Caledonian footballer who plays as a goalkeeper for Lössi. He made his debut for the national team on March 25, 2016 in their 1–0 loss against Vanuatu.

References

External links
 

1996 births
Living people
New Caledonian footballers
AS Lössi players
AS Mont-Dore players
New Caledonia international footballers
Association football goalkeepers
2016 OFC Nations Cup players